All That I Am is Australian writer Anna Funder's first fictional work, published in 2011. It follows characters affected by the Nazi regime in pre-war Germany and Britain.

Publication
The book was first published in 2011 by Penguin Books.

Plot
A young Ruth Becker meets and marries a leading journalist, Hans Wesemann, while visiting her cousin Dora in Munich in 1923. Together they participate in left wing activism. Ten years later, as Hitler becomes Chancellor of Germany, Ruth and Hans, together with Dora Fabian and her lover, playwright Ernst Toller, are forced to flee to London. In exile in London, always in danger of being deported by the British Government, they dedicate themselves to making the world realise how dangerous Hitler really is. The storytelling shifts from the point of view of Toller shortly before his suicide in New York in 1939, and the sole survivor Ruth in Sydney in 2001.

All of the characters in All That I Am are real people; however Funder has reconstructed their stories, as a lot of the memories and moments that compel the story cannot be verified. In her notes Funder writes: "I have made connections and suppositions, for that I take full responsibility."

Characters
 Ruth Becker - One of two storytellers, begins as a young woman in Germany and falls in love with Hans Wesemann, but recollects events from her home in Sydney in 2001.
 Hans Wesemann - Journalist and satirist who finds himself lost in translation when exiled to London.
 Dora Fabian - Forceful and passionate cousin of Ruth.
 Ernst Toller - A poet and reluctant activist prone to long bouts of severe depression. He is also recollecting past events, but it is before his suicide in New York in 1939.
 Berthold Jacob - A journalist who suffers under the Nazi regime, and helps engineer the escape of the other four.

Critical reception
All That I Am garnered generally positive reviews and many awards. David Marr said: "In language of admirable simplicity she explores the shadowy ambiguities lurking in her characters – ambiguities that have always fascinated her: the good that comes with bad and the bad with good". ABC Radio Perth critic Miriam Borthwick said "It is a riveting portrayal of real people's lives lived in terrible circumstances". The Guardian, while generally praising the work, was conscious and somewhat wary of the literary reconstruction of real events, concluding that it was "a studiously researched fantasy about the past that stages an almost self-annihilating debate about reconstruction".

Awards
2012 Miles Franklin Award
2012 Australian Book Industry Award (ABIA), Book of the Year
2012 Barbara Jefferis Award
2012 Australian Independent Booksellers Indie Book Award for Literary Fiction

References

2011 Australian novels
Novels about Nazi Germany
Novels set in London
Miles Franklin Award-winning works
Penguin Books books